Melissa Taylor (born Melissa Maughn, August 27) is a Canadian professional wrestler best known as her ring name 21st Century Fox.

Professional wrestling career
Maughn was originally trained by Sid Summers in Cambridge, Ontario.

Pure Wrestling Association
In October 2005, Maughn was defeated by Misty Haven in the finals of the Pure Wrestling Association (PWA)'s Women's Elite 8 Cup Tournament.

Maughn won the PWA's Elite Women's Championship for the first time in 2005 from Cheerleader Melissa. In March 2006, Maughn dropped the title to Melissa, but she regained it in a triple threat match against Melissa and Misty Haven. She defended it against Haven on July 22, 2006 at PWA's One Year Anniversary Show. Maughn also retained her title in a match against Tiana Ringer before losing it to Aurora in July. Maughn, however, regained the title the same night. She also traded the title with Misty Haven and defended it against challengers such as Miss Danyah and Portia Perez.

In September 2006, she defeated Ivory in a wedding veil on a pole match with special guest referee Molly Holly. In April 2007, she defended her title against April Hunter.

Other promotions
In late 2005, she participated in CIWA North's first women's wrestling match. She won a tag team match with Angel Williams against Tracy Brooks and Elmira the Iron Maiden. Maughn had a tryout match with World Wrestling Entertainment in September 2006.

A month later in November, she participated in Great Canadian Wrestling's W.I.L.D. Tournament, but lost to Sirelda, the eventually winner of the tournament. In the 2007 tournament, she was defeated in the first round by Portia Perez.

Personal life
Maughn has an older brother. In high school, she played on the girls' football team for three years.

Championships and accomplishments
Old School Pro Wrestling
OSPW Women's Championship (1 time)
IAW Wrestling
IAW North American Women's Championship (1 time)
Pure Wrestling Association
PWA Elite Women's Championship (5 times)

References

21st-century professional wrestlers
Canadian female professional wrestlers
Living people
Professional wrestlers from Montreal
Year of birth missing (living people)